Sentinel-2 is an Earth observation mission from the Copernicus Programme that systematically acquires optical imagery at high spatial resolution (10 m to 60 m) over land and coastal waters. The mission is currently a constellation with two satellites, Sentinel-2A and Sentinel-2B; a third satellite, Sentinel-2C, is currently undergoing testing in preparation for launch in 2024.

The mission supports a broad range of services and applications such as agricultural monitoring, emergencies management, land cover classification or water quality.

Sentinel-2 has been developed and is being operated by the European Space Agency, and the satellites were manufactured by a consortium led by Airbus Defence and Space in Friedrichshafen.

Overview
The Sentinel-2 mission has the following key characteristics:
 Multi-spectral data with 13 bands in the visible, near infrared, and short wave infrared part of the spectrum
 Systematic global coverage of land surfaces from 56° S to 84° N, coastal waters, and all of the Mediterranean Sea
 Revisiting every 10 days under the same viewing angles. At high latitudes, Sentinel-2 swath overlap and some regions will be observed twice or more every 10 days, but with different viewing angles.
 Spatial resolution of 10 m, 20 m and 60 m
 290 km field of view
 Free and open data policy

To achieve frequent revisits and high mission availability, two identical Sentinel-2 satellites (Sentinel-2A and Sentinel-2B) operate together. The satellites are phased 180 degrees from each other on the same orbit. This allows for what would be a 10-day revisit cycle to be completed in 5 days. The 290 km swath is created by the VNIR and SWIR, which are each made of 12 detectors that are lined in two offset rows.

The orbit is Sun synchronous at  altitude, 14.3 revolutions per day, with a 10:30 a.m. descending node. This local time was selected as a compromise between minimizing cloud cover and ensuring suitable Sun illumination. It is close to the Landsat local time and matches SPOT, allowing the combination of Sentinel-2 data with historical images to build long-term time series.

Launches
The launch of the first satellite, Sentinel-2A, occurred 23 June 2015 at 01:52 UTC on a Vega launch vehicle.

Sentinel-2B was launched on 7 March 2017 at 01:49 UTC, also aboard a Vega rocket.

Sentinel-2C is scheduled to launch in 2024 on a Vega-C launch vehicle.

Instruments
The Sentinel-2 satellites each carry a single multi-spectral instrument (MSI) with 13 spectral channels in the visible/near infrared (VNIR) and short wave infrared spectral range (SWIR). Within the 13 bands, the 10 meter spatial resolution allows for continued collaboration with the SPOT-5 and Landsat-8 missions, with the core focus being land classification.

Designed and built by Airbus Defense and Space in France, the MSI imager uses a push-broom concept and its design was driven by the large  swath requirements together with the high geometrical and spectral performance required of the measurements. The mirrors are rectangular and made of silicon carbide, a similar technology to those on the Gaia mission. The system also employs a shutter mechanism preventing direct illumination of the instrument by the sun. This mechanism is also used in the calibration of the instrument. Out of all the different civic optical earth observation missions, Sentinel-2 is the first to have the ability to show three bands in the red edge. The radiometric resolution is 12 bit with brightness intensity ranging from 0–4095.

Spectral bands

Temporal offsets
Due to the layout of the focal plane, spectral bands within the MSI instrument observe the surface at different times and vary between band pairs. These temporal offsets can be used to gain additional information, for example to track propagating natural and man-made features such as clouds, airplanes or ocean waves

Applications

Sentinel-2 serves a wide range of applications related to Earth's land and coastal water.

The mission provides information for agricultural and forestry practices and for helping manage food security. Satellite images will be used to determine various plant indices such as leaf area chlorophyll and water content indexes. This is particularly important for effective yield prediction and applications related to Earth's vegetation.

As well as monitoring plant growth, Sentinel-2 is used to map changes in land cover and to monitor the world's forests. It also provides information on pollution in lakes and coastal waters. Images of floods, volcanic eruptions  and landslides contribute to disaster mapping and help humanitarian relief efforts.

Examples of applications include:
 Monitoring land cover change for environmental monitoring
 Agricultural applications, such as crop monitoring and management to help food security
identification of buried archaeological sites
 Detailed vegetation and forest monitoring and parameter generation (e.g. leaf area index, chlorophyll concentration, carbon mass estimations)
 Observation of coastal zones (marine environmental monitoring, coastal zone mapping)
 Inland water monitoring
 Glacier monitoring, ice extent mapping, snow cover monitoring
 Flood mapping & management (risk analysis, loss assessment, disaster management during floods)
 Lava flow mapping 

The Sentinel Monitoring web application offers an easy way to observe and analyse land changes based on archived Sentinel-2 data.

Products
The following two main products are generated by the mission:

 Level-1C: Top-of-atmosphere reflectances in cartographic geometry (combined UTM projection and WGS84 ellipsoid). Level-1C products are tiles of 100 km x 100 km each one with a volume of approximately 500 MB. These products are radiometrically and geometrically corrected (including orthorectification). This product can be obtained from the Copernicus Open Access Hub. 
 Level-2A: Surface reflectances in cartographic geometry. This product is considered as the mission Analysis Ready Data (ARD), the product that can be used directly in downstream applications without the need for further processing. This product can be obtained either from the Copernicus Open Access Hub  or generated by the user with the sen2cor processor from ESA's SNAP Toolbox.

Additionally, the following product for expert users is also available:

Level-1B: Top of atmosphere radiances in sensor geometry. Level-1B is composed of granules, one granule represents the sub-image one of the 12 detectors in the across track direction (25 km), and contains a given number of lines along track (approximately 23 km). Each Level-1B granule has a data volume of approximately 27 MB.  Given the complexity of Level-1B products, their usage require an advanced expertise.

Gallery
Examples of images taken.

References

External links

 Sentinel-2 at ESA
 Copernicus at ESA
 Sentinel-2 data sheet
Sentinel-2 Mission Requirements Document

Copernicus Programme
Earth observation satellites of the European Space Agency
Twin satellites